Jens Zimmermann (born 5 January 1967) is a German sports shooter. He competed at the 1992 Summer Olympics and the 1996 Summer Olympics.

References

External links
 

1967 births
Living people
Sportspeople from Lower Saxony
German male sport shooters
Olympic shooters of Germany
Shooters at the 1992 Summer Olympics
Shooters at the 1996 Summer Olympics
20th-century German people